The 1980 Copa Libertadores de América Finals was the final two-legged tie to determine the Copa Libertadores de América champion. It was contested by Uruguayan club Nacional and Brazilian club Internacional. The first leg of the tie was played on 30 July at Estádio Beira-Rio of Porto Alegre, with the second leg played on 6 August at Estadio Centenario in Montevideo.

With the first game tied 1–1, Nacional crowned champion after winning the second leg 1–0 with goal by striker Waldemar Victorino, achieving their second Copa Libertadores title. Victorino was the top scorer of the edition with 6 goals.

Format
The finals was played over two legs; home and away. The team that accumulated the most points —two for a win, one for a draw, zero for a loss— after the two legs was crowned champion. If the two teams were tied on points after the second leg, a playoff in a neutral would become the next tie-breaker. Goal difference was used as a last resort.

Qualified teams

Venues

Match details

First leg

Second leg

References

1980 in South American football
Copa Libertadores Finals
Club Nacional de Football matches
Sport Club Internacional matches
Football in Uruguay
Football in Brazil